Photosystem I (PSI, or plastocyanin–ferredoxin oxidoreductase) is one of two photosystems in the photosynthetic light reactions of algae, plants, and cyanobacteria. Photosystem I  is an integral membrane protein complex that uses light energy to catalyze the transfer of electrons across the thylakoid membrane from plastocyanin to ferredoxin. Ultimately, the electrons that are transferred by Photosystem I are used to produce the moderate-energy hydrogen carrier NADPH. The photon energy absorbed by Photosystem I also produces a proton-motive force that is used to generate ATP. PSI is composed of more than 110 cofactors, significantly more than Photosystem II.

History 
This photosystem is known as PSI because it was discovered before Photosystem II, although future experiments showed that Photosystem II is actually the first enzyme of the photosynthetic electron transport chain. Aspects of PSI were discovered in the 1950s, but the significance of these discoveries was not yet recognized at the time. Louis Duysens first proposed the concepts of Photosystems I and II in 1960, and, in the same year, a proposal by Fay Bendall and Robert Hill assembled earlier discoveries into a coherent theory of serial photosynthetic reactions. Hill and Bendall's hypothesis was later confirmed in experiments conducted in 1961 by the Duysens and Witt groups.

Components and action 
Two main subunits of PSI, PsaA and PsaB, are closely related proteins involved in the binding of the vital electron transfer cofactors P, Acc, A, A, and F. PsaA and PsaB are both integral membrane proteins of 730 to 750 amino acids that contain 11 transmembrane segments. A [4Fe-4S] iron-sulfur cluster called F is coordinated by four cysteines; two cysteines are provided each by PsaA and PsaB. The two cysteines in each are proximal and located in a loop between the ninth and tenth transmembrane segments. The terminal electron acceptors F and F, also [4Fe-4S] iron-sulfur clusters, are located in a 9-kDa protein called PsaC that binds to the PsaA/PsaB core near F.

Photon 

Photoexcitation of the pigment molecules in the antenna complex induces electron and energy transfer.

Antenna complex 

The antenna complex is composed of molecules of chlorophyll and carotenoids mounted on two proteins. These pigment molecules transmit the resonance energy from photons when they become photoexcited. Antenna molecules can absorb all wavelengths of light within the visible spectrum. The number of these pigment molecules varies from organism to organism. For instance, the cyanobacterium Synechococcus elongatus (Thermosynechococcus elongatus) has about 100 chlorophylls and 20 carotenoids, whereas spinach chloroplasts have around 200 chlorophylls and 50 carotenoids. Located within the antenna complex of PSI are molecules of chlorophyll called P700 reaction centers. The energy passed around by antenna molecules is directed to the reaction center. There may be as many as 120 or as few as 25 chlorophyll molecules per P700.

P700 reaction center 

The P700 reaction center is composed of modified chlorophyll a that best absorbs light at a wavelength of 700 nm. P700 receives energy from antenna molecules and uses the energy from each photon to raise an electron to a higher energy level (P700*). These electrons are moved in pairs in an oxidation/reduction process from P700* to electron acceptors, leaving behind P700. The pair of P700* - P700 has an electric potential of about −1.2 volts. The reaction center is made of two chlorophyll molecules and is therefore referred to as a dimer. The dimer is thought to be composed of one chlorophyll a molecule and one chlorophyll a′ molecule. However, if P700 forms a complex with other antenna molecules, it can no longer be a dimer.

Modified chlorophyll A and A  

The two modified chlorophyll molecules are early electron acceptors in PSI. They are present one per PsaA/PsaB side, forming two branches electrons can take to reach F. A accepts electrons from P700*, passes it to A of the same side, which then passes the electron to the quinone on the same side. Different species seems to have different preferences for either A/B branch.

Phylloquinone 

A phylloquinone, sometimes called vitamin K, is the next early electron acceptor in PSI. It oxidizes A in order to receive the electron and in turn is re-oxidized by F, from which the electron is passed to F and F. The reduction of Fx appears to be the rate-limiting step.

Iron–sulfur complex 

Three proteinaceous iron–sulfur reaction centers are found in PSI. Labeled F, F, and F, they serve as electron relays. F and F are bound to protein subunits of the PSI complex and F is tied to the PSI complex. Various experiments have shown some disparity between theories of iron–sulfur cofactor orientation and operation order. In one model, F passes an electron to F, which passes it on to F to reach the ferredoxin.

Ferredoxin 

Fd moves to carry an electron either to a lone thylakoid or to an enzyme that reduces . Thylakoid membranes have one binding site for each function of Fd. The main function of Fd is to carry an electron from the iron-sulfur complex to the enzyme ferredoxin– reductase.

Ferredoxin– reductase (FNR) 

FNR may also accept an electron from NADPH by binding to it.

Plastocyanin 
Plastocyanin is an electron carrier that transfers the electron from cytochrome b6f to the P700 cofactor of PSI in its ionized state P700.

Ycf4 protein domain 
The Ycf4 protein domain found on the thylakoid membrane is vital to photosystem I. This thylakoid transmembrane protein helps assemble the components of photosystem I. Without it, photosynthesis would be inefficient.

Evolution 

Molecular data show that PSI likely evolved from the photosystems of green sulfur bacteria. The photosystems of green sulfur bacteria and those of cyanobacteria, algae, and higher plants are not the same, but there are many analogous functions and similar structures. Three main features are similar between the different photosystems. First, redox potential is negative enough to reduce ferredoxin. Next, the electron-accepting reaction centers include iron–sulfur proteins. Last, redox centres in complexes of both photosystems are constructed upon a protein subunit dimer. The photosystem of green sulfur bacteria even contains all of the same cofactors of the electron transport chain in PSI. The number and degree of similarities between the two photosystems strongly indicates that PSI and the analogous photosystem of green sulfur bacteria evolved from a common ancestral photosystem.

See also 

Biohybrid solar cell

References

External links 
Photosystem I: Molecule of the Month in the Protein Data Bank
Photosystem I in A Companion to Plant Physiology
James Barber FRS Photosystems I & II

Photosynthesis
Light reactions
EC 1.97.1
Protein complexes